Adolphus Frederick Hubbard  (ca. 1785 – 27 August 1832) was an American politician. Between 1822 and 1826 he served as Lieutenant Governor of Illinois.

Life
Adolphus Hubbard was born in Warren County in Kentucky. At the time of his birth this area still belonged to Virginia. In his early years he moved to Shawneetown in the Illinois Territory, which became the state of Illinois in 1818. He studied law and practiced as a lawyer. Hubbard joined the Democratic-Republican Party and became a member of the constitutional convention. In 1820 he was a Presidential Elector for James Madison.
 
In 1822 Hubbard was elected to the office of the Lieutenant Governor of Illinois. He served in this position between 5 December 1822 and 6 December 1826 when his term ended. In this function he was the deputy of Governor Edward Coles. Hubbard was very ambitious. He tried unsuccessfully to be appointed to the U.S. Senate. In 1825 Governor Coles was absent from the state for several weeks and Hubbard fulfilled his duties during this time. After the return of the Governor Hubbard was not prepared to step down to his original position as Lieutenant Governor. He constructed some arguments that would allow him to officially execute the functions of the state's Governor. The case was brought to Court and Hubbard's claim was rejected. In 1826 Hubbard ran unsuccessfully in the regular elections for the Governor's office.

After the end of his term as Lieutenant Governor Hubbard did not held any other political offices. He died on 27 August 1832 in Quincy in Illinois.

External links
 The Political Graveyard
 Online Biography

1780s births
1832 deaths
People from Warren County, Kentucky
People from Shawneetown, Illinois
Illinois lawyers
Illinois Democratic-Republicans
Lieutenant Governors of Illinois
19th-century American lawyers